The 2018–19 Premier League Cup was the sixth edition of the competition. The defending champions were Aston Villa, who won the 2017–18 competition.

Participants

Category 1
Aston Villa
Birmingham City
Blackburn Rovers
Burnley
Derby County
Everton
Leeds United
Leicester City
Liverpool
Newcastle United
Norwich City
Nottingham Forest
Reading
Southampton
Stoke City
Sunderland
West Bromwich Albion
Wolverhampton Wanderers

Category 2 
AFC Bournemouth
Bristol City
Charlton Athletic
Colchester United
Doncaster Rovers
Fulham
Hull City
Peterborough United
Sheffield United
Swansea City

Category 3 
Bristol Rovers
Exeter City
Newport County
Notts County
Oxford United
Plymouth Argyle
Portsmouth
Southend United

Qualifying round 
A qualifying round was required to finalise the 32 teams that would enter the Group Stage.

Group stage 
Teams play each other twice, with the group winners and runners–up advance to the round of 16.

Group A

Group B

Group C

Group D

Group E

Group F

Group G

Group H

Knockout stages

Round of 16

Quarter–final

Semi–final

Final 

 

 

|-
|colspan=4|Substitutes:
|-
 
 
 
 

|-
|colspan=4|Coach:  David Unsworth
|-

 
 

 

 
 

|-
|colspan=4|Substitutes:
|-

 
 

|-
|colspan=4|Coach:  Chris Hogg
|-

See also 

 2018–19 Professional U23 Development League
 2018–19 FA Youth Cup

References 

2018–19 in English football
Premier League Cup (football)